Crime Wave is a 2018 Spanish black comedy film directed by Gracia Querejeta. The cast, led by Maribel Verdú, also features Juana Acosta, Paula Echevarría, Antonio Resines, Raúl Arévalo, Luis Tosar and Javier Cámara.

Plot 
Set in Biscay, the plot follows the mishaps of Leyre, a well-off and happily divorced woman whose son has killed his father in a fit of rage, doing whatever it takes for the crime to remain unsolved, henceforth unleashing a wave of crimes across Bilbao and its surroundings.

Cast

Production 
The film is a Telecinco Cinema, Bowfinger International Pictures, Historias del Tío Luis and Crimen Zinema A.I.E. production and it had the participation of Mediaset España and Movistar+. It was shot in 2017 in locations of Biscay, including Getxo, Bilbao and Portugalete, as well as in Madrid.

Luis Marías, Ghislain Barrois, Álvaro Augustin, María Luisa Gutiérrez, Santiago Segura and Eduardo Carneros were credited as producers.

Release 
Distributed by Universal Pictures International Spain, the film was theatrically released in Spain on 5 October 2018.

Reception 
Reviewing for El Periódico de Catalunya, Beatriz Martínez rated the film with 2 out of 5 stars, lamenting the tone and the overly histrionic performances, considering that, despite welcoming the attempt to turn male archetypes into female ones, the result is uneven and nears a "retrograde" discourse.

Sergio F. Pinilla of Cinemanía gave the film 3 out of 5 stars, considering that Verdú does it well enough to sustain the film by herself, concluding that it was "silly, yes, but attractive".

Jordi Batlle Caminal of Fotogramas scored 3 out of 5 stars, highlighting the "perfectly matched" cast, while deeming the Querejeta's "stingy" mise-en-scène as the worst feature of the film.

Javier Ocaña of El País deemed to be a "deficient" film, configured as a madcap black comedy, yet rarely finding the right tone.

Luis Martínez of Metrópoli gave it 3 out of 5 stars, considering Crime Wave a film "as liberating as absolutely free. Feverish and suicidal. All at the same time", where "it is obligatory to surrender to Verdú's ability to be herself in many more ways than imaginable".

See also 
 List of Spanish films of 2018

References

External links 
 Crime Wave at ICAA's Catálogo de Cinespañol

Films shot in Bilbao
Films shot in Madrid
Films set in Spain
2010s Spanish-language films
2018 films
2018 black comedy films
Spanish black comedy films
Films directed by Gracia Querejeta
Telecinco Cinema films
Bowfinger International Pictures films
2010s Spanish films